The Years of Extermination: Nazi Germany and the Jews, 1939–1945 is the second volume of Saul Friedländer's history of Nazi Germany and the Jews.  It describes the German extermination policies that resulted in the murder of six million European Jews. The book presents a detailed history of the Holocaust and is based on a vast array of documents and memoirs. It won the 2007 Leipzig Book Fair Prize for Non-fiction and won the Pulitzer Prize for General Non-Fiction in 2008.

Historian Richard J. Evans, writing in The New York Times said that, though written with academic rigor, "what raises The Years of Extermination to the level of literature, however, is the skilled interweaving of individual testimony with the broader depiction of events."

Friedländer is an Intentionalist on the origins of the Holocaust question. However, Friedländer rejects the extreme Intentionalist view that Adolf Hitler had a master plan for the genocide of the Jewish people going back to the time when he wrote Mein Kampf. Friedländer, through his research on the Third Reich, has reached the conclusion that there was no intention to exterminate the Jews of Europe before 1941. Friedländer's position might best be deemed moderate Intentionalist.

The first volume is The Years of Persecution: Nazi Germany and the Jews, 1933-1939 (1998).

See also
 Blood and Soil (book)

References

External links
 

2007 non-fiction books
Pulitzer Prize for General Non-Fiction-winning works
History books about the Holocaust
Books about Nazism
History books about Nazi Germany
History books about World War II
21st-century history books
HarperCollins books